Dmitri Vladimirovich Ekimov (born 5 February 1971) is a Belarusian-Russian former footballer and coach. He made one appearance for the Belarus national team in 1996.

References

External links
 
 
 
 

1971 births
Living people
Russian footballers
Belarusian footballers
Belarus international footballers
Association football goalkeepers
Russian expatriate footballers
Belarusian expatriate footballers
Russian expatriate sportspeople in Poland
Belarusian expatriate sportspeople in Poland
Expatriate footballers in Poland
FC Dynamo Brest players
FC FShM Torpedo Moscow players
FC Dinamo Minsk players
FC Tom Tomsk players
Belarusian Premier League players
FC Chita players
FC Spartak-MZhK Ryazan players